Marco Djuricin (born 12 December 1992) is an Austrian professional footballer who plays as a forward for Rijeka. He came to prominence in his native Austria with Sturm Graz, scoring 24 goals in 44 appearances, before joining Red Bull Salzburg in 2015. He has played professionally in Austria, Germany, England, Hungary, Switzerland and Croatia. He has been capped by Austria at international level.

Club career

Hertha BSC
A forward, Djuricin began his career with SV Donau in 1999, before have alternate spells with Rapid Wien and Austria Wien. After a short spell with FC Stadlau in 2008, he moved to Germany to enter the youth academy at Bundesliga club Hertha BSC. During the 2009–10 season, Hertha's U19 team reached the final of the DFB Youth Cup, but despite Djuricin's equaliser, Hertha lost the match 2–1 to 1899 Hoffenheim. During the 2010–11 pre-season, Djuricin was called up to the first team's training camp in his native Austria. Coach Markus Babbel was impressed by his performance during the camp and called in him up for Hertha's remaining pre-season friendlies.

Breakthrough
Djuricin made his debut for Hertha's reserve team in a 2–2 Regionalliga Nord draw with Hallescher FC on 6 August 2010. Following injuries to Patrick Ebert, Raffael and Daniel Beichler, Djuricin received his maiden first team call up on the opening day of the 2010–11 2. Bundesliga season against Rot-Weiß Oberhausen. He made his debut after just 18 minutes as a substitute for Rob Friend. Djuricin had a dream debut, scoring two second-half goals to help Hertha to a 3–2 win. He signed a new four-year contract shortly after the match. Djuricin went on to make 9 appearances during a successful 2010–11 season for Hertha, which saw the club promoted back to the Bundesliga at the first time of asking.

Djuricin spent the majority of the 2011–12 Bundesliga season with the reserves, scoring 9 goals in 16 appearances. He made two first team substitute appearances in early 2012 and was on the bench for both of Hertha's relegation playoff matches, which were lost to Fortuna Düsseldorf and consigned the club to relegation straight back to the 2. Bundesliga. During the 2012 off-season, new Hertha manager Jos Luhukay announced that Djuricin was not in his first team plans.

On 9 August 2012, Djuricin joined 2. Bundesliga club Jahn Regensburg on loan for the duration of the 2012–13 season. He missed two months of the campaign with a broken sesamoid in his foot and made 17 appearances and scored three goals in a dire season for the Jahn, with a bottom-place finish consigning the club to relegation to the 3. Liga.

Djuricin departed Hertha in June 2013 and made just 11 appearances and scored two goals in three seasons as a first team player at the Olympiastadion.

Sturm Graz 
Djuricin returned to Austria to sign a contract with Austrian Bundesliga club Sturm Graz in June 2013. He made his debut in a 0–0 UEFA Europa League second qualifying round draw with Breiðablik on 18 July 2013, the first European appearance of his career. After just two further appearances, a cruciate ligament injury saw Djuricin fail to return to the team until December. He finished the 2013–14 season with 23 appearances and seven goals. Djuricin showed good goalscoring form in the first half of the 2014–15 season, scoring 17 goals in 21 games before departing the UPC-Arena on 8 January 2015. He made 44 appearances and scored 24 goals during 18 months with Graz.

Red Bull Salzburg

On 8 January 2015, Djuricin signed a -year contract with Austrian Bundesliga club Red Bull Salzburg. He scored just three goals in 16 appearances in the second half of the 2014–15 season, but received the first silverware of his career when Salzburg won the league title at the end of the campaign. He collected another medal by virtue of being an unused substitute in Salzburg's 2–0 victory over Austria Wien in the 2015 ÖFB Cup Final. 

After four appearances early in the 2015–16 season, Djuricin moved to England to sign for Championship club Brentford on loan until the end of the 2015–16 season. He scored within 29 minutes of his debut in a 1–1 draw with against Leeds United on 12 September and made it two goals in three games with the winner versus Preston North End one week later. He came into form again in late October, scoring twice in three matches in wins versus Wolverhampton Wanderers and West London rivals Queens Park Rangers, the latter match being Brentford's first win over QPR for 50 years. An ankle ligament injury suffered early in a 1–1 draw with Blackburn Rovers on 7 November kept Djuricin out of the team for two months. He returned to the bench in mid-January 2016 and broke back into the starting lineup in late February, but was sidelined due to illness in March. Djuricin made just two further appearances and finished the season with 4 goals from 23 appearances.

On 23 June 2016, Djuricin joined Nemzeti Bajnokság I club Ferencváros on loan for the duration of the 2016–17 season. He made 30 appearances and scored 10 goals during the season, but was left out of the matchday squad which emerged victorious in the 2017 Magyar Kupa Final. Following a further season-long loan during the 2017–18 season, Djuricin left the club when his contract expired at the end of the 2017–18 season.

Grasshoppers 
In July 2017, Djuricin moved to Swiss Super League club Grasshopper Club Zürich on a season-long loan, with the option to transfer permanently. He made 25 appearances and scored 9 goals during the 2017–18 season and permanently joined the club on a two-year contract. After 24 appearances and seven goals during the 2018–19 season, Djuricin departed the club.

Karlsruher SC 
On 14 June 2019, Djuricin returned to Germany to join 2. Bundesliga club Karlsruher SC on a two-year contract. He finished the 2019–20 season with 19 appearances. After making just seven appearances during the first half of the 2020–21 season, Djuricin's contract was terminated by mutual consent on 31 January 2021.

Austria Wien
On 2 February 2021, Djuricin signed a contract with Austrian Bundesliga club Austria Wien on a free transfer. In what remained of the 2020–21 season, he scored seven goals in 17 appearances, helped the club qualify for the 2021–22 Europa Conference League and signed a new three-year contract. During the 2021–22 season, Djuricin scored 11 goals in 32 appearances and helped the club qualify for the 2022–23 Europa League play-off round. Following four appearances and one goal during the opening weeks of the 2022–23 season, Djuricin departed the club. He made 53 appearances and scored 19 goals during 18 months at the Franz Horr Stadium.

HNK Rijeka 
On 31 August 2022, Djuricin transferred to Croatian First League club Rijeka and signed a three-year contract. He made five appearances prior to the winter break, after which he was frozen out of the squad by incoming head coach Sergej Jakirović.

International career
Djuricin won 26 caps and scored 9 goals for Austria between under-17 and under-21 level. He scored a penalty at the 2010 UEFA European Under-19 Championship and the resulting win over the Netherlands qualified the team for the 2011 FIFA U-20 World Cup in Colombia, though he would miss the tournament through injury.

Djuricin made his senior Austria debut on 27 March 2015 in a UEFA Euro 2016 qualifying match away to Liechtenstein at the Rheinpark Stadion in Vaduz and replaced Marc Janko for the final 13 minutes of a 5–0 victory.

Personal life
Djuricin is of Serbian-Croatian descent. His father, Goran, is a former footballer and a manager.

Career statistics

1.Includes DFB-Pokal, Austrian Cup, FA Cup, Magyar Kupa and Swiss Cup.
2.Includes UEFA Europa League, UEFA Champions League and UEFA Europa Conference League.

Honours
Red Bull Salzburg
 Austrian Bundesliga: 2014–15
 Austrian Cup: 2014–15

References

External links

 Marco Djuricin at nk-rijeka.hr
 
 
 
 
Marco Djuricin at oefb.at

1992 births
Living people
Footballers from Vienna
Austrian footballers
Austrian expatriate footballers
Association football forwards
Hertha BSC players
Hertha BSC II players
SSV Jahn Regensburg players
SK Sturm Graz players
FC Red Bull Salzburg players
Brentford F.C. players
Ferencvárosi TC footballers
Grasshopper Club Zürich players
Karlsruher SC players
Bundesliga players
2. Bundesliga players
Regionalliga players
Austrian Football Bundesliga players
Nemzeti Bajnokság I players
Swiss Super League players
Austria youth international footballers
Austria under-21 international footballers
Austria international footballers
Austrian people of Croatian descent
Austrian people of Serbian descent
Austrian expatriate sportspeople in Germany
Expatriate footballers in Germany
Austrian expatriate sportspeople in England
Expatriate footballers in England
Austrian expatriate sportspeople in Hungary
Expatriate footballers in Hungary
Austrian expatriate sportspeople in Switzerland
Expatriate footballers in Switzerland
FK Austria Wien players
2. Liga (Austria) players
Austrian expatriate sportspeople in Croatia
HNK Rijeka players
Expatriate footballers in Croatia
Croatian Football League players